The Allnighter is the second solo studio album by Glenn Frey, the guitarist and co-lead vocalist for the Eagles. The album was released in mid-1984 on MCA in the United States and the United Kingdom, two years after Frey's modestly successful debut album No Fun Aloud and four years after the demise of the Eagles. It was and still is Frey's most successful solo album throughout his whole solo career, having reached No. 22 on the Billboard charts, and releasing two top 20 singles with "Smuggler's Blues" and "Sexy Girl". The album achieved gold status by the RIAA in the US. It is generally regarded as the culmination of the smoother, more adult-oriented sound of Frey's solo work.

The single "Smuggler's Blues" helped to inspire the Miami Vice episode of the same name, and Frey was invited to star in that episode, which was Frey's acting debut. The music video for the single also won Frey an MTV Video Music Award in 1985.

Composition
When Frey was asked about his song writing partnership with Jack Tempchin, he said at the time that "It’s funny, there are only those certain people where things click — at least for me. He’s very free. I’ll just run some soul licks by him, or I’ll ring him something like The Allnighter, which originally was just about staying up all night. But then we started talking about it and Jack says, ‘Staying up all night can’t play over three or four verses. What if the Allnighter was a guy?’ So, we made him into some woman’s every-guy." The lyrics of "Better in the U.S.A" are opposed to the Soviet Union.

Critical reception
In a contemporary review for The Village Voice, music critic Robert Christgau gave The Alnighter a "C" and panned it as a "smarmy piece of sexist pseudosoul". In a retrospective review for The Rolling Stone Album Guide (1992), Mark Coleman gave the album two out of five stars and wrote that it "glistens with synthesized oomph, but the sugar coating doesn't sit well on Frey's mannered white R&B loverman act." On the other hand, AllMusic's William Ruhlmann retrospectively gave it four-and-a-half stars and said that it departs from the "old Eagles sound" of Frey's last album for a "bluesy, rocking feel."

Track listing
All songs by Glenn Frey and Jack Tempchin, except where noted.

Additional track

Personnel 

 Glenn Frey – lead vocals, electric piano (1, 10), electric guitar (1, 2, 4, 6, 8, 9), bass (2, 5), backing vocals (2, 4, 7-10), guitar (3), organ (5), acoustic guitar (5), synthesizers (6), slide guitar (6), acoustic piano (8), celesta (10)

Additional musicians
 David "Hawk" Wolinski – synthesizers (1), organ (1, 7, 10), keyboards (4), synthesizer programming (4, 9), fuzz guitar (4)
 Barry Beckett – synthesizers (2), acoustic piano (2, 8), keyboards (3)
 Nick DeCaro – accordion (5), string arrangements (5)
 Vince Melamed – electric piano (7)
 Duncan Cameron – harmony vocals, lead guitar (2), guitar (3), electric guitar (5-8), acoustic guitar (10)
 Josh Leo – electric guitar (6, 7, 10)
 Bryan Garofalo – bass (1, 6, 7, 9, 10)
 David Hood – bass (3, 8)
 John Robinson – drums (1, 4)
 Larrie Londin – drums (2, 3, 8)
 Michael Huey – drums (6, 7, 10)
 Steve Forman – percussion (1, 9), congas (6)
 Victor Feldman – vibraphone (7)
 Al Garth – saxophone (4, 7)
 Lee Thornburg – flugelhorn (10)
 The Heart Attack Horns (3, 7, 9):
 Bill Bergman – saxophone
 Jim Colie – saxophone
 Greg Smith – saxophone, horn arrangements (9)
 John Berry, Jr. – trumpet 
 Lee Thornburg – trumpet, horn arrangements (3, 7)
 Roy Galloway – backing vocals (2, 4, 7-10)
 Jack Tempchin – backing vocals (2, 8), acoustic guitar (5)
 Luther Waters – backing vocals (2, 8)
 Oren Waters – backing vocals (2, 4, 7-10)

Production 
 Producers – Allan Blazek and Glenn Frey (Tracks 1-10); Barry Beckett (Tracks 2, 3 & 8).
 Recorded and Mixed by Allan Blazek
 Second Engineers – Ray Blair and Steve Melton
 Assistant Engineers – Lee Daley, Pete Greene and Rich Markowitz.
 Art Direction – Jeff Adamoff
 Illustration – Dave Sizer
 Photography – Jim Shea
 Management – The Fitzgerald Hartley Co.

Sales chart performance

Peak positions

Singles

See also
 List of albums released in 1984

References

1984 albums
Glenn Frey albums
MCA Records albums
Albums produced by Barry Beckett
Blue-eyed soul albums